Pakistan is a federal parliamentary republic, powers shared between the Federal government and the provinces. Relations between federation and provinces is defined in Part V(Articles  141-159) of the constitution.

Council of Common Interests
Council of Common Interests or CCI was body to solve disputes between federation and provinces. The membership of CCI consisted of the Prime Minister, Provincial Chief Ministers and three members nominated by federal government.

Legislative powers
The power of the Provinces and the Federal government were defined by the constitution and the legislative powers are divided into twenty lists. 
Concurrent List was abolished after 18th amendment, and most of them were transferred to provinces.

See also
 Constitution of Pakistan
 Federal Government of Pakistan
 List of countries by federal system

References

External links
Federalism in Pakistan

 
Constitution of Pakistan
Pakistan
Government of Pakistan